David Henderson (born March 2, 1943) was a CBS Network News television and radio journalist. He appeared on the CBS Evening News, CBS Morning News and other programs. After reporting from the Vietnam War, Henderson’s investigative news stories included an exposé of conditions in America’s cotton industry and workers who suffered from byssinosis or “brown lung disease,” (aka Byssinosis) caused by dust during cotton processing. In a series of reports uncovering the safety of airliners, he reported that the plastic interiors of commercial airliners released deadly toxic gases during fires. He was awarded a national Emmy Award.

Since leaving CBS News, Henderson has been a proponent of the power of authentic storytelling to unite people. He has advised businesses and organizations worldwide on strategic communications, image management and competitive leadership, using stories. He has been active in technology for more than 30 years, and beta-tested Apple II Plus display technology for the company in the early 1980s.

Henderson is an early expert in the utilizing WordPress to effectively manage and enhance media awareness through news stories, video and news photos for organizations that seek media dominance.  He has championed the use of digital technology and timely, legitimate news websites for corporations and organizations to become the center of news in their respective business sectors.

Rainn Wilson - popular actor, author and activist - says, "David Henderson gets it. He knows the online media world and has interesting things to say. He's the dude who got me on Twitter."

Henderson is a native on the Washington, D.C., area and attended George Mason University. Henderson is author of “Making News in the Digital Era,” "The Media Savvy Leader," and “Making News: A Straight-Shooting Guide to Media Relations,” which is used widely as a university textbook. The series of books chronicle sea changes in mainstream media, the evolution of digital media, and new methods to effectively command media attention.  He has taught at the University of Virginia and lectures at George Washington University.

External links
Personal Webpage
Boomer Cafe
Emmy Awards in Journalism

Notes

1943 births
Living people
American investigative journalists
George Mason University alumni
Morehead State University alumni
CBS News people